Artur von Casimir (4 September 1908 - 15 December 2005) was a German Oberst and former bomber pilot who flew for the Luftwaffe during World War II. Since 2004 he has received a great deal of publicity in Norway. One of the Heinkel He 111 he flew was recovered from Jonsvatnet lake near Trondheim in 2004, where it had been submerged since falling through the ice during the spring thaw in April 1940. He commanded Kampfgruppe 100 during the German invasion of Norway, and led the air raids on Namsos on 20 April 1940 (See Namsos Campaign). He assumed the position of Gruppenkommandeur over KGr. 100 on 16 February 1940.

Von Casimir was shot down by two Hawker Hurricane fighters from the British No. 46 Squadron RAF during an attack on Skånland in Troms on 29 May 1940. He made an emergency landing at Ulsvåg in Nordland and was captured. Von Casimir was first held as a prisoner of war by the Norwegians, before being transferred to British custody.

References

Bibliography

External links
Nrk.no retrieved on 11 April 2007
The loss of Rutlandshire retrieved on 11 April 2007
 A site about the restorations of a Ju 88 and the He 111 recovered from Jonsvannet.

1908 births
2005 deaths
Luftwaffe pilots
German World War II pilots
World War II prisoners of war held by Norway
German prisoners of war in World War II held by the United Kingdom
Officers Crosses of the Order of Merit of the Federal Republic of Germany